Argiagrion is a genus of damselfly in the family Coenagrionidae. It is monotypic in that it contains only one species,  Argiagrion leoninum.

References

 

Coenagrionidae
Zygoptera genera
Taxa named by Edmond de Sélys Longchamps
Taxonomy articles created by Polbot